"Al Khamsa" is a designation applied to specific desert-bred bloodlines of the Arabian horse considered particularly "pure" by Arabian horse breeders, who sometimes also describe such lines with by use of the Arabic word asil, meaning "pure".

Al Khamsa roughly translates as 'The Five'.  It refers to a mythical group of foundation mares that were the legendary founders of the Arabian breed.  While some breeders claim these mares really existed, there is no objective, historical way to verify such a claim.  The modern definition of an Arabian as Al Khamsa usually refers to a horse that can be verified in every line of its pedigree to trace to specific named desert-bred Arabians with documentation that their breeding was attested to by a Bedouin seller who had sworn a formal oath (generally invoking Allah) that the animal was asil or pure of blood.  This standard is only met by approximately two percent of all registered Arabians today.  Such horses included the desert-bred imports of the Crabbet Arabian Stud, the imports from Syria of Homer Davenport, many of the horses imported from Egypt that were originally bred by Muhammad Ali of Egypt, Abbas Pasha, Ali Pasha Sherif, or the Royal Agricultural Society and its successor organizations, and other desert-bred horses obtained throughout the Middle East by buyers such as Carl Raswan who were familiar with bloodlines and the formal sales procedures of the Bedouin to properly document animals of Asil bloodlines.

The Legend

The legend of Al Khamsa refers to the five favorite horses of Muhammad.  While there are several variants on the tale, a common version states that after a long journey through the desert, Muhammad turned his herd of horses loose at an oasis for a desperately needed drink of water. Before the herd reached the water, Muhammad blew his battle horn for the horses to return to him. Only five mares responded. Because they faithfully returned to their master, though desperate with thirst, these mares became his favorites and were called Al Khamsa, and became the legendary founders of the five "strains" of the Arabian horse.  Although the Al Khamsa are generally considered fictional horses of legend, some breeders today claim the modern Bedouin Arabian actually descended from these mares.  Modern horses that can trace all of their bloodlines to documented Bedouin strains are collectively known as "Al Khamsa Arabians".

Strains
Over time, the Bedouin developed several sub-types or strains of Arabian horse, each with unique characteristics, and traced through the maternal line only. The five primary strains, attributed to have descended from the Al Khamsa were known as the Keheilan, Seglawi, Abeyan or Obeyan, Hamdani, and Hadban or Hedban. Carl Raswan, a promoter and writer about Arabian horses from the middle of the 20th century, held the belief that there were only three strains, Kehilan, Seglawi and Muniqi or Maanagi. Raswan felt that these strains represented body "types" of the breed, with the Kehilan being "masculine", the Seglawi being "feminine" and the Muniqi being "speedy".  There were also lesser strains, sub-strains, and regional variations in strain names. Purity of bloodline was very important to the Bedouin, and they also believed in telegony, believing if a mare was ever bred to a stallion of "impure" blood, the mare herself and all future offspring would be "contaminated" by the stallion and hence no longer Asil.

References

External links
Al Khamsa organization
Arabian and part-Arabian horses